Below is a complete list of the Games of the Small States of Europe records in swimming, ratified by the National Olympic Committees of the 9 European member federations. They all are members of the European Olympic Committees (EOC) and have a population of less than one million. Participating countries are: 

 
, 

*

(*) Montenegro became the ninth GSSE country on June 1, 2009; at a meeting held presumably at the 2009 Games.

Competition is held in long course (50 m) pools.

Men's events

Women's events

References

External links

Games
Records
Games
Swimming records
Swimming